John Donald Manke (January 1917 – August 12, 1985) was an American sheriff and politician.

Born in January 1917, Manke attended Edgemont High School for two years. He did not graduate, but eventually earned a certification equivalent to the high school diploma in 1975. From 1971 to 1979, Manke was the sheriff of Fall River County, South Dakota. He ran in the state legislative elections of 1980, and served in the South Dakota Senate between 1981 and 1985. Manke died of a heart attack on August 12, 1985, while traveling to Fall River Feedlot near Hot Springs, South Dakota. His funeral, held four days later, was attended by Bill Janklow. Manke's wife Margaret died in August 2003.

References

1917 births
1985 deaths
Republican Party South Dakota state senators
South Dakota sheriffs
20th-century American politicians